Merritt R. Butrick (September 3, 1959 – March 17, 1989) was an American actor, known for his roles on the teen sitcom Square Pegs (1982), in two Star Trek feature films, and a variety of other acting roles in the 1980s.

Early life and career
Butrick was born in Gainesville, Florida, and was an only child. He graduated in 1977 from Tamalpais High School in Mill Valley, California. He attended the California Institute of the Arts for acting, but did not complete his degree.

His first screen role was as a rapist in two 1981 episodes of the police drama Hill Street Blues.

He was cast as John "Johnny Slash" Ulasewicz, a major supporting character in the teen sitcom Square Pegs (1982), which received critical praise but was cancelled after 19 episodes (one season). The character was described by one critic as an "apparent (but never declared) gay student."

While Square Pegs was in pre-broadcast production, Butrick was cast to play David Marcus, the son of James T. Kirk (William Shatner) and his former lover Carol Marcus (Bibi Besch), in Star Trek II: The Wrath of Khan (1982). He continued the role in the follow-up film Star Trek III: The Search for Spock (1984), in which the character was killed. He later appeared as T'Jon, the captain of a cargo vessel rescued by the crew of the Enterprise in "Symbiosis" (1988), an episode of Star Trek: The Next Generation.

Meanwhile, he appeared in the comedy film Zapped! (1982), the horror film Fright Night Part 2 (1988), and as Barbara Hershey's hillbilly son in the drama film Shy People (1987). He had a variety of guest roles on television series and television films.

He received critical praise from Time magazine for his performance at the Los Angeles Theatre Center in the play Kingfish, in which he played a ditzy, petulant muscle-boy prostitute. It was his last acting role.

Death and legacy
Butrick died of toxoplasmosis, complicated by AIDS, on March 17, 1989, at the age of 29. He has at least two panels dedicated to him as part of the NAMES Project AIDS Memorial Quilt, both referencing his role as David Marcus.

The 2008 release of Square Pegs on DVD included a featurette dedicated to Butrick in which his co-stars Jami Gertz and Sarah Jessica Parker, and series creator Anne Beatts, paid tributes to and recounted anecdotes about Butrick.

Butrick's Star Trek III co-star Robin Curtis offered similar praise on the DVD commentary for that film. Director Nicholas Meyer, who had directed him in Star Trek II, included a scene in Star Trek VI: The Undiscovered Country (filmed after Butrick's death), in which Captain Kirk puts a photograph of his murdered son on his desk.

Some sources state that Butrick was gay.  Kirstie Alley, his co-star in Star Trek II, identified Butrick as being bisexual.

Filmography

References

External links

 
 

 Merritt Butrick fansite

1959 births
1989 deaths
20th-century American male actors
Male actors from Florida
AIDS-related deaths in California
American male film actors
American male stage actors
American male television actors
Bisexual male actors
California Institute of the Arts alumni
LGBT people from Florida
Male actors from Gainesville, Florida
Tamalpais High School alumni
20th-century American LGBT people
American bisexual actors